Lac de l'Entonnoir or Lac de Bouverans is a lake at Bouverans in the Doubs department of France.

Entonnoir